A jellyfish galaxy is a type of galaxy found in galaxy clusters. They are characterised by ram pressure stripping of gas from the affected galaxy by the intracluster medium, triggering starbursts along a tail of gas.

Jellyfish galaxies have been seen in a number of galaxy clusters including the Hydra Cluster, Abell 2125 (redshift z=0.20; ACO 2125 C153); Abell 2667 (z=0.23; G234144−260358); Abell 2744 (z=0.31; ACO 2744 Central Jellyfish;  HLS001427–30234/ACO 2744 F0083; GLX001426–30241 / ACO 2744 F0237 / ACO 2733 CN104; MIP001417–302303 / ACO 2744 F1228; HLS001428–302334; GLX001354–302212 ).

Gallery

References

Galaxies